The R605 road is a regional road in County Cork, Ireland. It travels from the N71 road at Innishannon to Kinsale, via the village of Dunderrow.

References

Regional roads in the Republic of Ireland
Roads in County Cork